Celso Giardini (born 10 June 1958) is an Italian sports shooter. He competed at the 1980 Summer Olympics, the 1984 Summer Olympics and the 1988 Summer Olympics.

References

1958 births
Living people
Italian male sport shooters
Olympic shooters of Italy
Shooters at the 1980 Summer Olympics
Shooters at the 1984 Summer Olympics
Shooters at the 1988 Summer Olympics
Sportspeople from Rome
20th-century Italian people
21st-century Italian people